Leslie Irvin may refer to:

 Leslie Irvin (parachutist) (1895–1966), parachutist who made the first free-fall parachute jump
 Leslie Irvin (serial killer) (1924–1983), serial killer active in the Midwest in the early 1950s

See also
Les Irwin (1898–1985), Australian politician